Phallic processions are public celebrations featuring a phallus, a representation of an erect penis.

Ancient Greece
Called phallika in ancient Greece, these processions were a common feature of Dionysiac celebrations; they advanced to a cult center, and were characterized by obscenities and verbal abuse. The display of a  fetishized phallus was a common feature. In a famous passage in chapter 4 of the Poetics, Aristotle formulated the hypothesis that the earliest forms of comedy originated and evolved from "those who lead off the phallic processions", which were still common in many towns at his time.

Modern Greece
The city of Tyrnavos holds an annual festival, a traditional phallophoric event on the first days of Lent.

Japan
Similar parades of Shinto origin have long been part of the rich traditions of matsuri (Japanese festivals). Although the practice is no longer common, a few, such as Kawasaki's Kanamara Matsuri and Komaki's Hōnen Matsuri, continue to this day. Typically, the phallus is placed in a mikoshi, a portable Shinto shrine.

See also
Fertility rite
Liberalia (Roman festival)

Notes

References
Richardson, N. J., The Homeric Hymn to Demeter. Oxford, 1974, pp. 214–15
O’Higgins, Laurie, Women and Humor in Classical Greece. Cambridge, 2003. p. 57
For the outrageous practice of "abuse from the wagons" see Fluck, H., Skurrile Riten in griechischen Kulten. Diss. Freiburg. Endingen, 1931., pp. 34–51
Pickard-Cambridge, Arthur, Dithyramb, Tragedy, and Comedy. 2nd edition, rev. by T.B.L. Webster. Cambridge, 1962.
Reckford, Kenneth, Aristophanes’ Old-and-New Comedy. Chapel Hill, 1987. pp. 463–65
[Ralph M. Rosen] (2006) Comic Aischrology and the Urbanization of Agroikia, pp. 219–238
The Problem of Origins  in Cornford, F. M. the Origin of Attic Comedy. Ed. T. H. Gaster. Intro Jeffrey Henderson. Ann Arbor: U of MI P, 1993.
Eric Csapo Riding the Phallus for Dionysus: Iconology, Ritual, and Gender-Role De/Construction Phoenix, Vol. 51, No. 3/4 (Autumn–Winter, 1997), pp. 253–295

External links
The Origins of Comedy from the Central University of New York
THE RURAL DIONYSIA of Apollonius Sophistes 
ARISTOPHANES CLOUDS

Ancient Greek religion
Cult of Dionysus
Phallic symbols